The American Mideast Conference (AMC) was an affiliate of the National Association of Intercollegiate Athletics that included eight member institutions in Ohio, Pennsylvania, New York, and Massachusetts.  Founded in 1949, it was known as the Mid-Ohio League, and named the Mid-Ohio Conference from 1962 until 1998, when it adopted its final moniker.  The name change was the first step in a multi-phase expansion that extended the conference into states beyond Ohio before the league was eventually disbanded in 2012.

History
In its final five years the conference experienced a number of changes, with numerous members moving to the National Collegiate Athletic Association (NCAA). Former members Roberts Wesleyan and Walsh University received admission to the NCAA and underwent the process of transferring athletics into Division II; Houghton College transitioned to Division III and joined the Empire 8 conference in 2012–13.  Daemen, Roberts Wesleyan, and Point Park applied for NCAA Division II status in June 2011 and in July 2011 Roberts Wesleyan was approved for membership. In June 2011 former AMC members Cedarville, Notre Dame College, Urbana, and Ursuline College announced the creation of a new NCAA DII conference that hoped to develop and expand for an anticipated lifting of the moratorium on new NCAA DII conferences in 2013. In July 2011, Cedarville, and Notre Dame were awarded NCAA provisional status, while  Malone University and Ursuline College were granted candidacy year two, all three left the NAIA and AMC for the 2011–12 academic year. With the addition of Fisher College from the collapsed Sunrise Athletic Conference, there were reports that the AMC would operate as an eight team conference in 2011–12 with the eight teams being Carlow, Daemen, Fisher, Houghton, Point Park, Roberts Wesleyan, Wilberforce, and Walsh.  However, on January 12, 2012, the Kentucky Intercollegiate Athletic Conference (KIAC; now known as the River States Conference) announced that it had accepted Point Park University and Carlow University as full members beginning with the 2012–13 school year.  This left Fisher College and Wilberforce University as the only remaining members, but as they have now become NAIA independent schools in the Association of Independent Institutions, the conference has been shut down.

Chronological timeline
 1949 - The American Mideast Conference was founded as the Mid-Ohio League (MOL). Charter members included Ashland College (now Ashland University), Bluffton College (now Bluffton University), Cedarville College (now Cedarville University), Defiance College and Findlay College (now the University of Findlay), effective beginning the 1949–50 academic year.
 1950 - Ohio Northern University joined the MOL, effective in the 1950–51 academic year.
 1955 - Wilmington College joined the MOL, effective in the 1955–56 academic year.
 1962 - Findlay and Ohio Northern left the MOL, effective after the 1961–62 academic year.
 1962 - The MOL was renamed as the Mid-Ohio Conference (MOC), effective in the 1962–63 academic year.
 1965 - Malone College (now Malone University) joined the MOC, effective in the 1965–66 academic year.
 1966 - Ashland left the MOC, effective after the 1965–66 academic year.
 1967 - Findlay re-joined back to the MOC for a second time, effective in the 1967–68 academic year.
 1971 - Bluffton, Defiance and Wilmington (with Findlay for a second time) left the MOC to form part as charter members of the Hoosier–Buckeye Collegiate Conference (HBCC), effective after the 1970–71 academic year.
 1971 - Ohio Dominican College (now Ohio Dominican University), Rio Grande College (now the University of Rio Grande) and Urbana College (now Urbana University) joined the MOC, effective in the 1971–72 academic year.
 1973 - Tiffin University joined the MOC, effective in the 1973–74 academic year.
 1975 - Mount Vernon Nazarene College (now Mount Vernon Nazarene University) joined the MOC, effective in the 1975–76 academic year.
 1976 - Walsh College (now Walsh University) joined the MOC, effective in the 1976–77 academic year.
 1989 - Malone left the MOC, effective after the 1988–89 academic year.
 1991 - Shawnee State University joined the MOC, effective in the 1991–92 academic year.
 1993 - Two institutions re-joined back to the MOC (Findlay for a third time, and Malone for a second time), effective in the 1993–94 academic year.
 1997 - Findlay left the MOC for a third time and the NAIA to join the Division II ranks of the National Collegiate Athletic Association (NCAA) and the Great Lakes Intercollegiate Athletic Conference (GLIAC), effective after the 1996–97 academic year.
 1998 - The MOC had rebranded as the American Mideast Conference during its 50th anniversary, effective in the 1998–99 academic year.
 1998 - Geneva College, Notre Dame College and Saint Vincent College joined the American Mideast, effective in the 1998–99 academic year.
 1999 - Point Park College (now Point Park University), Seton Hill College (now Seton Hill University) and Wilberforce University joined the American Mideast, effective in the 1999–2000 academic year.
 2000 - Central State University joined the American Mideast, effective in the 2000–01 academic year.
 2001 - Carlow College (now Carlow University), Daemen College, Houghton College, Roberts Wesleyan College and Ursuline College joined the American Mideast, effective in the 2001–02 academic year.
 2002 - Central State left the American Mideast and the NAIA to join the NCAA Division II ranks as an NCAA D-II Independent, effective after the 2001–02 academic year.
 2006 - Saint Vincent left the American Mideast and the NAIA to join the NCAA Division III ranks and the Presidents' Athletic Conference (Presidents'), effective after the 2005–06 academic year.
 2007 - Three institutions left the American Mideast and the NAIA to join their respective new home primary conferences: Geneva to join the NCAA Division III ranks and the Presidents', Seton Hill to join the NCAA Division II ranks and the West Virginia Intercollegiate Athletic Conference (WVIAC), and Tiffin to join the NCAA Division II ranks as an NCAA D-II Independent (who would later join the GLIAC, effective beginning the 2008–09 academic year), effective after the 2006–07 academic year.
 2007 - The University of Northwestern Ohio joined the American Mideast as an associate member for some sports, effective in the 2007–08 academic year.
 2008 - Urbana left the American Mideast and the NAIA to join the NCAA Division II ranks as an NCAA D-II Independent (who would later join the Great Midwest Athletic Conference (G-MAC), effective beginning the 2012–13 academic year), effective after the 2007–08 academic year.
 2008 - Northwestern Ohio had upgraded to full membership within the American Mideast for all sports, effective in the 2008–09 academic year.
 2009 - Two institutions left the American Mideast to join their respective new home primary conferences: Ohio Dominican to leave the NAIA to join the NCAA Division II ranks as an NCAA D-II Independent (who would later join the GLIAC, effective in the 2010–11 academic year), and Rio Grande to the Mid-South Conference, effective after the 2008–09 academic year.
 2010 - Two institutions left the American Mideast to join their respective new home primary conferences: Northwestern Ohio to the Wolverine–Hoosier Athletic Conference (WHAC), and Shawnee State to the Mid-South Conference (MSC), effective after the 2009–10 academic year.
 2011 - Four institutions left the American Mideast to join their respective new home primary conferences: Cedarville, Notre Dame (Oh.) and Ursuline (with Malone for a second time) to leave the NAIA to join the NCAA Division II ranks as NCAA D-II Independents (which Cedarville and Ursuline later join the G-MAC; Malone would later join the GLIAC, effective beginning the 2012–13 academic year; and Notre Dame (Oh.) would later join the Mountain East Conference, effective beginning the 2013–14 academic year), and Mount Vernon Nazarene to the Crossroads League, all effective after the 2010–11 academic year.
 2011 - Fisher College joined the American Mideast, effective in the 2011–12 academic year.
 2012 - The American Mideast ceased operations as an athletic conference, effective after the 2011–12 academic year; as many schools left to join their respective new home primary conferences, effective beginning the 2012–13 academic year: Roberts Wesleyan to leave the NAIA to join the NCAA Division II ranks and the East Coast Conference (ECC), Houghton to leave the NAIA to join the NCAA Division III ranks and the Empire 8 Athletic Conference, Walsh to leave the NAIA to join the NCAA Division II ranks and the GLIAC, Carlow and Point Park to the Kentucky Intercollegiate Athletic Conference (KIAC; now known as the River States Conference), and Daemen, Fisher and Wilberforce as NAIA Independents (although Daemen would later follow Roberts Wesleyan to join the NCAA D-II ECC, effective since the 2013–14 academic year).

Member schools
A list of past members of the American Mideast Conference:

Final members
The American Mideast ended with eight full members, all were private schools:

Notes

Members leaving before 2012
The American Mideast had 21 former full members, all but two were private schools:

Notes

Membership timeline

Sports
The AMC formerly sponsored 15 sports:

 Women's championships: cross-country, soccer, volleyball, basketball, softball, golf, tennis, track and field
 Men's championships: cross-country, soccer, basketball, baseball, golf, tennis, track and field

Administration
Presidents of member institutions maintained active rolls of governance over the organization by way of the Council of Presidents.

Additionally, the AMC included a staff of conference officials:

James D. Houdeshell, Commissioner
Mark Womack, AMC Administrative Assistant
Deron Brown, Supervisor of Umpires, Baseball
Linda Cairney, Supervisor of Umpires, Softball
Bill Ek, Supervisor of Officials, Basketball
Karen Fulks, Treasurer
James Phipps, Eligibility Chair
Diane Plas, Supervisor of Officials, Women's Basketball, Volleyball
Kim Vieira, Supervisor of Officials, Men's and Women's soccer

See also
 List of NAIA conferences
 List of NAIA institutions

References

 
1949 establishments in the United States
Sports leagues disestablished in 2012